Final Symphony II was a symphonic concert tour first held at the Beethovenhalle in Bonn, Germany on August 29, 2015, and continuing through 2019. The concert performances featured arrangements of video game music selected from the Final Fantasy series, specifically Final Fantasy V, VIII, IX, and XIII. It is divided into four acts, one per game, with the newest game, Final Fantasy XIII, first, and the oldest, V, last; all four arrangements are single-section arrangements, with the IX portion as a piano concerto. The tour was a follow up to Final Symphony, a similar tour of orchestral arrangement performances from Final Fantasy VI, VII, and X beginning in 2013 and continuing through 2018. The concert was produced and directed by Thomas Böcker of Merregnon Studios, with arrangements provided by Finnish composer and musician Jonne Valtonen, along with Roger Wanamo and Final Fantasy XIII composer Masashi Hamauzu. The original works were composed by Nobuo Uematsu and Hamauzu, and an introductory piece was composed by Valtonen. The premiere concert was performed by the Beethoven Orchestra Bonn under conduction from Eckehard Stier, with guest performer Mischa Cheung joining the orchestra on piano.

Following the initial performance, Final Symphony II was performed in several other venues. It was first performed in London (United Kingdom) at the Barbican Centre by the London Symphony Orchestra on September 12, 2015. The London Symphony Orchestra then travelled to Japan to perform the concert in Osaka on September 27, and twice in Yokohama on October 4, the first time that a non-Japanese orchestra played a video game music concert in Japan. The 2016 performances of the concert were a concert on April 1 at the Tampere Hall in Tampere, Finland by the Tampere Philharmonic Orchestra, and a June 9 concert by the Royal Stockholm Philharmonic Orchestra at the Stockholm Concert Hall in Stockholm, Sweden. The Tampere concert featured an extra encore piano performance in addition to the two encores performed at all concerts. The 2019 performances were by the Netherlands Philharmonic Orchestra and by the Essen Philharmonic Orchestra July 5 and July 6 at the Concertgebouw in Amsterdam, Netherlands and the Philharmonic Hall Essen in Essen, Germany.

A video of the Stockholm performance of the Final Fantasy VIII section was released on September 23, 2016, and unlike the original Final Symphony no album release has been announced to date. One piece, "Final Fantasy VIII – Mono no aware", was included in the Symphonic Memories Concert series in 2018 and 2019, and include in the associated Symphonic Memories Concert - music from Square Enix album. The concerts have been heavily praised, both for the quality of the performance and for the quality of the arrangements. Critics have claimed the concerts to be one of the highest quality video game music orchestral performances produced, along with the original Final Symphony, with the second tour considered to have simpler arrangement styles than the first but in turn be more approachable to audiences.

Concert

Production

Thomas Böcker first began producing orchestral concerts of video game music in 2003 with the first Symphonic Game Music Concert in Leipzig, Germany. In 2008, he, through his production company Merregnon Studios, began a series of four concerts of video game music that used longer, more elaborate arrangements of themes from the individual pieces of music from the games. This Symphonic series of concerts stood in contrast to the more standard concerts, which played straightforward orchestral versions of individual songs. The four concerts were Symphonic Shades – Hülsbeck in Concert (2008), Symphonic Fantasies: Music from Square Enix (2009), Symphonic Legends – Music from Nintendo (2010), and Symphonic Odysseys: Tribute to Nobuo Uematsu (2011). Both Symphonic Fantasies and Symphonic Odysseys featured music from the Final Fantasy series composed by Nobuo Uematsu. Böcker has said that he considers Uematsu to be "the most famous composer of video game music and in general one of the most influential", and that Uematsu's 20020220 - Music from Final Fantasy concert in 2002 was a big influence on his own concerts.

By May 2012, Böcker was working on a concert of music solely from the Final Fantasy series, titled Final Symphony. The idea for the concert was first proposed by Uematsu in 2009 after Symphonic Fantasies; the concert had featured Final Fantasy music as one of its four components, but unlike the other three the music had been a straightforward medley rather than a more complicated arrangement. Uematsu had asked the team to keep the arrangements similar to those in other Final Fantasy concerts, but after the concert he felt that an opportunity had been missed to create something unique like the other three arrangements, especially the Secret of Mana section. He encouraged Böcker to take more liberties with the source material if the opportunity arose, and hoped that another concert could be created in the future. Böcker proposed Final Symphony later that year to Uematsu, and got approval from Square Enix while coordinating a Tokyo concert of Symphonic Fantasies. Final Symphony was the first concert consisting entirely of new Final Fantasy arrangements in over ten years, since 20020220 - Music from Final Fantasy.

Böcker and the arrangers intended the arrangements in the concert to be "about telling the stories of the games". In order to "capture the atmosphere of the games", they limited the concert to three games from the series, so as not to spread the concert too thin. They chose Final Fantasy VI, VII, and X as the games. Jonne Valtonen, Roger Wanamo, and Masashi Hamauzu created the arrangements for the concert. Valtonen and Wanamo had previously worked with Böcker on the concerts in the Symphonic series, and Böcker has stated that if they had been unavailable for the project he would not have created Final Symphony at all. Hamauzu, in addition to arranging the Final Fantasy X music, was one of the composers of the original pieces he arranged. Uematsu, who composed music for all three games, served as a consultant for the project, though he did not arrange any pieces.

The first performance of Final Symphony was in Wuppertal, Germany at the Historische Stadthalle Wuppertal on May 11, 2013. The concert was held twice that day, performed by the Wuppertal Symphony Orchestra, and was conducted by Eckehard Stier, who had previously conducted for Symphonic Fantasies in Tokyo. The concert was very well received, and went on to be performed in five other cities around the world in 2013 and 2014. An album for the concert, recorded from a studio session by the London Symphony Orchestra, was released in 2015. A new concert, Final Symphony II, was announced in May 2015 to be in production and was first performed in September 2015.

Final Symphony II features long arrangements like the Final Symphony concerts, from different games: while the first concert was based on Final Fantasy VI, VII, and X, the second uses pieces from Final Fantasy V, VIII, IX, and XIII. Like the first concert, all of the arrangements are new, and not based on any previous work. The majority of the music was originally composed by Nobuo Uematsu, while the Final Fantasy XIII suite was originally composed by Masashi Hamauzu. The arrangers from the first concert reprised their roles for the second: Valtonen created the arrangements for the Final Fantasy V section, Wanamo worked on the VIII and IX portions, and Hamauzu, with assistance from Valtonen, arranged Hamauzu's own compositions from XIII with orchestration by Valtonen. Like they did for the previous concert, when Merregnon Studios first began the project, Böcker, Valtonen, and Wanamo took a few months to play through the games, watch playthrough videos, and read reviews and analyses of the games, in order to understand the structure and progression of the main themes of the music in each game. An introductory fanfare, "In a Roundabout Way", was composed by Valtonen for the concert. Unlike Final Symphony, which featured three styles of orchestral performances—a piano concerto, a symphonic poem, and a three-movement symphony—all four arrangements are single-section arrangements, with the IX portion as a piano concerto.

The concert is arranged in reverse chronological order, with the newest game, Final Fantasy XIII, first, and the oldest, Final Fantasy V, last. Hamauzu, feeling that "there were no orchestral versions of Final Fantasy XIII tracks that [he] was really satisfied with", wanted to create a "ground-breaking" arrangement of the main themes of the game. He decided to create a dramatic arc with the songs, starting with "Prelude to Final Fantasy XIII", "Vanille's Theme", and "Nautilus" as setting the story's stage with pieces centered on the character of Vanille, followed by the battle themes of "Fang's Theme", "Blinded by Light", and "Serah's Theme" to shift into a dramatic conclusion. The arrangements of "Blinded by Light" and "Serah's Theme" are both based on previous, unfinished arrangements by Hamauzu. Valtonen claims that the bulk of the arrangement, named "Utopia in the Sky", was done by Hamauzu: "Hamauzu's jazzy and impressionistic style already gave the music its gentle softness to which I added my own small imprint." The Final Fantasy IX section, "For the People of Gaia" is in the form of a piano concerto, with an orchestral introduction. The concerto, like the other sections of the concert, is a single movement, though it contains elements of a traditional four movement concerto. The concerto is based on the characters' motifs from the game, beginning with music related to Vivi's theme, which inspired the idea for Wanamo. It continues through music related to Zidane, then Garnet, before ending with the battle against Kuja, interspersed with themes from the protagonist characters. Wanamo was concerned about doing another piano concerto, as Merregnon had done one based on the Final Fantasy series for Symphonic Odysseys and Final Symphony, but felt that the soundtrack of Final Fantasy IX was diverse enough to support another.

The third section, from Final Fantasy VIII, was also arranged by Wanamo, and is named "Mono no aware" after the Japanese term for the "awareness of impermanence". The name is intended to capture a theme from the game of the conflict between childhood and adulthood, as well as the destruction of the present in favor of an uncertain future. The arrangement roughly follows the games storyline, fading away in the end like the game with uncertainty as to the conclusion of the characters' themes; Wanamo has said that the arrangement was difficult to create due to the similar emotional themes in many of the songs. Wanamo tried to "explore pieces that shared fragments and worked well together", interleaving pieces and motifs throughout the arrangement. The final arrangement of the concert, that of Final Fantasy V, is named "Library of Ancients". Valtonen based the arrangement on "Musica Machina", played in the game in the ancient base underneath the library used by the heroes. As in the game the wind has disappeared, the arrangement thereafter uses the song as a base to represent the source of the wind flowing from there through to other locations and battles from the game. The concerts feature two encore pieces; "Clash on the Big Bridge" from Final Fantasy V, which is interrupted and interspersed with the series' "Chocobo Theme" in humorous counterpoint, and "Main Theme of Final Fantasy", originally from the first Final Fantasy game. The Tampere, Finland performance featured a third encore piece in the middle of the performance, a piano arrangement of "You’re Not Alone" by Wanamo.

Performances

The first concert was a September 12, 2015 performance by the London Symphony Orchestra at the Barbican Centre in London, England, with the piano concerto performed by Slava Sidorenko, although an earlier premier performance was held on August 29 at the Beethovenhalle in Bonn, Germany by the Beethoven Orchestra Bonn. The concert featured a performance by pianist Mischa Cheung, who had previously been featured in a Final Symphony concert in Tampere, Finland. After the debut performances, the London Symphony Orchestra traveled to Japan to perform the concert there three times: in Osaka on September 27, and twice in Yokohama on October 4. The performances were the first time that a non-Japanese orchestra played a video game music concert in Japan. The London performance sold out, while the Japanese mini-tour played to packed halls with around 7,000 attendees. 2016 performances of the concert included a concert on April 1 at the Tampere Hall in Tampere by the Tampere Philharmonic Orchestra, and a June 9 concert by the Royal Stockholm Philharmonic Orchestra at the Stockholm Concert Hall in Stockholm, Sweden. A recording of the Final Fantasy VIII section of the Stockholm performance was made available online. Böcker indicated at the Tampere performance that the reason behind the extra encore piano performance of "You're Not Alone" featured in the concert, like the prior extra encore piece in the Tampere performance of the original Final Symphony, was due to it being the home country of Valtonen and Wanamo and that Merregnon would likely continue the trend in the future. Selections from the concert, along with ones from Symphonic Fantasies and Final Symphony, were performed at Symphonic Memories concerts on June 9, 2018, in Stockholm, March 14 in Oulu, Finland, June 6 in St. Gallen, Switzerland, and December 14, 2019, in Kawasaki, Japan. An album for the concert, Symphonic Memories Concert - music from Square Enix, was released on September 24, 2020, containing a recording of the Kawasaki concert, including a rendition of "Final Fantasy VIII – Mono no aware".

Set list

Reception
The Final Symphony II concerts have received rave reviews from critics, who viewed it as a high-quality extension of the original Final Symphony concert series rather than a completely unique orchestral experience. A review of the premier concert in Bonn by Markus Roth of Video Game Music Online claimed that "the Final Symphony series is a masterclass concert series, which easily lends itself to musical discussion and interpretation of the highest standards", and that the second concert series was the equal to the original. Joe Hammond of Video Game Music Online, in a review of the London performance, said that Final Symphony II "wasn't reinventing the wheel or revolutionising what the team have already done, it was triumphantly expanding on previous success". He felt that the concert series was "lighter and more accessible" than the original due to its use of fewer and less complicated types of orchestral arrangements, and that Merregnon Studios did not "try to push the boundaries" but instead tried to "expand on the success of the Final Symphony 1 programme with other games in the series", in his opinion successfully. Stephen Little of Cubed Gamers, reviewing the same concert, termed it "stunning" and "a pleasure to watch, listen and be involved in", while John Son of Cubed3 said that the concert was "one of the best performances of video game music to have ever been showcased". A review of the Tampere concert by Nikolas Broman of Original Sound Version—his fifth Final Symphony II performance attendance—agreed with Hammond, stating that while he felt the original series was better, as it had more interesting arrangement styles and a more even quality, that audiences seemed to prefer the second series as "the arrangements were safer, the melodies closer to the originals, and overall it was perhaps easier to follow". He felt that the Final Fantasy IX section was the best, with the Final Fantasy XIII section as the weakest as "good... but nothing special". Regardless, he claimed that he could only compare Final Symphony II to the original series "because it doesn't make sense to compare it to anything else. It is leaps and bounds above any other major game music concert series".

See also
 Music of Final Fantasy V
 Music of Final Fantasy VIII
 Music of Final Fantasy IX
 Music of Final Fantasy XIII

References

External links
 Recording of the performance of "Final Fantasy VIII – Mono no aware" at the June 2016 concert by the Royal Stockholm Philharmonic Orchestra
 Official Merregnon Studios website

Video game concert tours
Final Fantasy music